Masbate language may refer to:
Masbateño language (Visayan)
Masbate Sorsogon language (Bikol)